Agadi may refer to places in India:

 Agadi, Dharwad, Karnataka
 Agadi, Haveri, Karnataka
 Agadi, Uttara Kannada